Kathleen Lucy Salmond (1895 – 5 May 1946) was a New Zealand artist, born in Dunedin.

Early life and education 
Salmond was born in Dunedin, the eldest daughter of architect Louis Salmond. She studied at the Dunedin Art School (now Otago Polytechnic). She travelled to the UK and spent a year at the Harvey-Proctor Art School in Cornwall (run by Ernest Procter and Harold Harvey), and the one year at the Slade School of Fine Art and St Martin's School of Art.

Career 
Salmond worked primarily with watercolour. She exhibited with:
 Auckland Society of Arts
 Canterbury Society of Arts
 New Zealand Academy of Fine Arts
 Otago Art Society
 The Group (1934)
Her work The Sunlit Farm was included in the New Zealand and South Seas Exhibition, Dunedin, 1925–6. She also exhibited works in London at the British Empire Art Exhibition and the Coronation Exhibition.

Works by Salmond are held in the collection of the Dunedin Public Art Gallery.

Salmond died in Dunedin on 5 May 1946, and she was buried at Andersons Bay Cemetery.

References

Further reading 
An artist file for Salmond is held at: 
 E. H. McCormick Research Library, Auckland Art Gallery Toi o Tāmaki
 Hocken Collections Uare Taoka o Hākena
 Te Aka Matua Research Library, Museum of New Zealand Te Papa Tongarewa
Also see:
 New Zealand Art: A Centennial Exhibition (1940)

1895 births
1946 deaths
New Zealand painters
New Zealand women painters
Artists from Dunedin
Alumni of Saint Martin's School of Art
Otago Polytechnic alumni
Alumni of the Slade School of Fine Art
People associated with the Canterbury Society of Arts
People associated with the Auckland Society of Arts
Women watercolorists
New Zealand watercolourists
People associated with The Group (New Zealand art)
Kathleen
Burials at Andersons Bay Cemetery